Gol Kheyrak-e Olya (also Romanized as Gol Kheyrak-e ‘Olyā; also known as Gol Kheyrak) is a village in Vizhenan Rural District, in the Central District of Gilan-e Gharb County, Kermanshah Province, Iran. At the 2006 census, its population was 100, in 25 families.

References 

Populated places in Gilan-e Gharb County